Flattenability in some -dimensional normed vector space is a property of graphs which states that any embedding, or drawing, of the graph in some high dimension  can be "flattened" down to live in -dimensions, such that the distances between pairs of points connected by edges are preserved. Flattenability was first called realizability, but the name was changed to avoid confusion with a graph having some DCS with a -dimensional framework.  

Flattenability has connections to structural rigidity, tensegrities, Cayley configuration spaces, and a variant of the Graph Realization Problem.

Definitions 

Flattenability can also be defined in terms of Cayley configuration spaces, see below connection to Cayley Configuration Spaces.

Properties 
Closure under subgraphs. Flattenability is closed under taking subgraphs.

Minor-closed.  Flattenability is a minor-closed property by a similar argument as above.

Flattening-Dimension.  The flattening dimension of a graph  in some normed vector space is the lowest dimension  such that  is -flattenable.  The flattening dimension of a graph is closely related to its gram dimension.  The following is an upper-bound on the flattening dimension of an arbitrary graph under the -norm.

Theorem.  The flattening dimension of a graph  under the -norm is at most .

For a detailed treatment of this topic, see Chapter 11.2 of.

Euclidean flattenability 
This section concerns flattenability results in Euclidean space, where distance is measured using the  norm, also called the Euclidean norm.

1-Flattenable graphs 
The following theorem is folklore and shows that the only forbidden minor for -flattenability is the complete graph .

Theorem.  A graph is 1-flattenable if and only if it is a forest.

Proof.  A proof can be found in.  For one direction, a forest is a collection of trees, and any distance constraint system whose graph is a tree can be realized in -dimension.  For the other direction, if a graph  is not a forest, then it has the complete graph  as a subgraph.  Consider the DCS that assigns the distance  to the edges of the  subgraph and the distance  to all other edges.  This DCS has a realization in 2-dimensions as the 1-skeleton of a triangle, but it has no realization in -dimension.

This proof allowed for distances on edges to be , but the argument holds even when this is not allowed.  See  for a detailed explanation.

2-Flattenable graphs 
The following theorem is folklore and shows that the only forbidden minor for -flattenability is the complete graph .

Theorem.  A graph is 2-flattenable if and only if it is a partial 2-tree.

Proof. A proof can be found in. For one direction, since flattenability is closed under taking subgraphs, it is sufficient to show that 2-trees are 2-flattenable. A 2-tree with  vertices can be constructed recursively by taking a 2-tree with  vertices and connecting a new vertex to the vertices of an existing edge. Proceed by induction on the number of vertices . When , consider any distance assignment  on the edges . Note that if  does not obey the triangle inequality, then this DCS does not have a realization in any dimension. Without loss of generality, place the first vertex  at the origin and the second vertex  along the x-axis such that  is satisfied. This method of placement is called a ruler and compass construction. Hence,  is 2-flattenable.  

Now, assume a 2-tree with  vertices is 2-flattenable. By the inductive hypothesis,  is 2-flattenable. Finally, by a similar ruler and compass construction argument as in the base case,  can be placed such that it lies in the plane. Thus, 2-trees are 2-flattenable by induction.

If a graph  is not a partial 2-tree, then it contains  as a minor. However, this DCS has no realization in 2-dimensions: when attempting to place the fourth vertex using a ruler and compass construction, the three circles defined by the fourth vertex do not all intersect.

Example.  Consider the graph in figure 2.  Adding the edge  turns it into a 2-tree; hence, it is a partial 2-tree.  Thus, it is 2-flattenable.

Example.  The wheel graph  contains  as a minor.  Thus, it is not 2-flattenable.

3-Flattenable graphs 
The class of -flattenable graphs strictly contains the class of partial -trees. These graphs are shown in Figure 3.

Theorem.

This is proven in  using mathematical tools from rigidity theory, specifically those concerning tensegrities. Figure 4 gives a visual proof that the graph  is not -flattenable. Vertices - have unique placements in -dimensions, up to congruence. Hence, the edge  has two distance values that can be realized in -dimensions. However, vertex  can revolve around the plane  in -dimensions while satisfying all constraints, so the edge  has infinitely many distance values that can only be realized in -dimensions or higher. Thus,  is not -flattenable.

These graphs are all -flattenable and these operations preserve -flattenability, so  is -flattenable.

The techniques in this proof yield the following result from.

Theorem.

Example. The previous theorem can be applied to show that the -skeleton of a cube is 3-flattenable.  Start with the graph , which is the 1-skeleton of a tetrahedron.  On each face of the tetrahedron, perform a 3-sum with another  graph, i.e. glue two tetrahedra together on their faces.  The resulting graph contains the cube as a subgraph and is 3-flattenable.

Flattenability in higher dimensions 
Giving a forbidden minor characterization of -flattenable graphs, for dimension , is an open problem.  For any dimension ,  and the 1-skeleton of the -dimensional analogue of an octahedron are forbidden minors for -flattenability.  It is conjectured that the number of forbidden minors for -flattenability grows asymptotically to the number of forbidden minors for partial -trees, and there are over  forbidden minors for partial -trees.

An alternative characterization of -flattenable graphs relates flattenability to Cayley configuration spaces.  See the section Connection to Cayley Configuration Spaces.

Connection to the Graph Realization Problem 
Given a distance constraint system and a dimension , the Graph Realization Problem asks for a -dimensional framework of the DCS, if one exists. For , realizing each tree in a forest in -dimension is trivial to accomplish in polynomial time.

Flattenability under p-norms 

Connection to algebraic geometry 
Determining the flattenability of a graph under a general -norm can be accomplished using methods in algebraic geometry, as suggested in.  The question of whether a graph  is -flattenable is equivalent to determining if two semi-algebraic sets are equal.  One algorithm to compare two semi-algebraic sets takes  time.

Connection to Cayley configuration spaces 
For general -norms, there is a close relationship between flattenability and Cayley configuration spaces.  The following theorem and its corollary are found in.

Theorem.

Corollary.

2-Flattenability under the l1 and l∞ norms 
The  and  norms are equivalent up to rotating axes in -dimensions, so -flattenability results for either norm hold for both. This section uses the -norm. These facts contribute to the following results on -flattenability under the -norm found in.

Observation.   The set of -flattenable graphs under the -norm (and -norm) strictly contains the set of -flattenable graphs under the -norm.

Theorem.   A -sum of -flattenable graphs is -flattenable if and only if at most one graph has a  minor.

The fact that  is -flattenable but  is not has implications on the forbidden minor characterization for -flattenable graphs under the -norm.  Specifically, the minors of  could be forbidden minors for -flattenability.  The following results explore these possibilities and give the complete set of forbidden minors.

Theorem.

Observation.

Observation.   Connected graphs on  vertices with  edges are -flattenable.

The only minor of  left is the wheel graph , and the following result shows that this is one of the forbidden minors.

Theorem.   A graph is -flattenable under the - or -norm if and only if it does not have either of the following graphs as minors:

 the wheel graph  or

Connection to structural rigidity 
This section relates flattenability to concepts in structural (combinatorial) rigidity theory, such as the rigidity matroid. The following results concern the -distance cone , i.e., the set of all -distance vectors that can be realized as a configuration of  points in some dimension. A proof that this set is a cone can be found in. The -stratum of this cone  are the vectors that can be realized as a configuration of  points in -dimensions.

A framework of a DCS  under an -norm is a generic framework (with respect to -flattenability) if the following two conditions hold:

Condition (1) ensures that the neighborhood  has full rank.  In other words,  has dimension equal to the flattening dimension of the complete graph  under the -norm.  See  for a more detailed discussion of generic framework for -norms.  The following results are found in.

Theorem.

Theorem.  -flattenability is not a generic property of graphs, even for the -norm.

Theorem.   A generic -flattenable framework of a graph  exists if and only if  is independent in the generic -dimensional rigidity matroid.

Corollary.   A graph  is -flattenable only if  is independent in the -dimensional rigidity matroid.

Theorem.  For general -norms, a graph  is

 rigid in -dimensions if and only if projecting the -stratum  onto the edges of  preserves its dimension;

References 

Graphs
Graph theory